The jive is a dance style that originated in the United States from the African Americans in the early 1930s. The name of the dance comes from the name of a form of African-American vernacular slang, popularized in the 1930s by the publication of a dictionary by Cab Calloway, the famous jazz bandleader and singer. In competition ballroom dancing, the jive is often grouped with the Latin-inspired ballroom dances, though its roots are based on swing dancing and not Latin dancing.

History
To the players of swing music in the 1930s and 1940s, "jive" was an expression denoting glib or foolish talk.

American soldiers brought Lindy Hop/jitterbug to Europe around 1940, where this dance swiftly found a following among the young. In the United States, "swing" became the most common word for the dance, and the term "jive" was adopted in the UK. Variations in technique led to styles such as boogie-woogie and swing boogie, with "jive" gradually emerging as the generic term in the UK.

See also
Modern Jive

References

External links

 
 The Jive Treasure Box - A comprehensive database of Modern Jive moves illustrated.

1930s introductions
Ballroom dance
Latin dances
Swing dances